Sandrella Awad (born 2 August 1983 in Marseille, France) is a French Paralympic wheelchair basketball player. She currently plays with the Handi Sud Basket team and the France women's national wheelchair basketball team. Sandrella Awad will be part of the French delegation at the 2016 Summer Paralympics in Rio.

International career 
As part of the French women's national wheelchair basketball team, Sandrella Awad took part in the following competitions : 
 2013 : European championship, 3rd place
 2014 : World championship, 8th place
 2015 : European championship,  4th place

See also
 France at the 2016 Summer Paralympics 
 Wheelchair basketball at the 2016 Summer Paralympics

References

 IPC Historical Results Archive

External links
 
 

1983 births
Living people
Paralympic competitors for France
French women's wheelchair basketball players